Leo Thompson (born 28 May 2000) is a New Zealand professional rugby league footballer who currently plays for the Newcastle Knights in the National Rugby League.

Background
Born in Muriwai, Gisborne, New Zealand, Thompson is of Māori descent. He played rugby union as a youth, before being signed by the Canberra Raiders.

Thompson is the identical twin brother of Chiefs Super Rugby player Tyrone Thompson.

Playing career

Early years
Thompson was a part of the Canberra Raiders' Jersey Flegg Cup team in 2020 and 2021. Ahead of the 2022 season, he signed a 2-year contract with the Newcastle Knights.

2022
In March, Thompson had his Knights contract upgraded from a development contract to a Top 30 contract, allowing him to join the NRL squad. In round 1 of the 2022 NRL season, he made his NRL debut for the Knights against the Sydney Roosters.

In July, Thompson had his contract extended until the end of 2025.

References

External links
Newcastle Knights profile

2000 births
Living people
Newcastle Knights players
New Zealand rugby league players
New Zealand Māori rugby league players
Rugby league props
Rugby league players from Gisborne Region